is a Japanese politician of the Constitutional Democratic Party and a member of the House of Councillors in the Diet (national legislature). A native of Shinjuku, Tokyo and graduate of Nihon University, he was elected for the first time in 2004.

Haku was born to a South Korean father and Japanese mother. At the time of his birth, both South Korean nationality law and Japanese nationality law imputed nationality solely by patrilineal descent, and thus he had South Korean citizenship rather than Japanese citizenship at birth, with the legal name Baek Jinhoon (백진훈). In 2003, he renounced his South Korean citizenship to naturalise as a Japanese citizen.

Haku worked for the Chosun Ilbo, a South Korean newspaper, from 1985 to 2004, serving as its Tokyo bureau chief from 1994 onward. He left the newspaper to enter politics in 2004. In 2012 he was named Senior Vice-Minister in the Cabinet Office under Prime Minister Yoshihiko Noda.

In the 2022 (Reiwa 4) ordinary election for the 26th House of Councillors, he ran as a candidate of the Constitutional Democratic Party from a proportional district. White received the 8th place out of 20 proportional candidates, falling short of the party's proportional 7 seats and losing the runner-up election.

See also

References and footnotes

External links 
  in Japanese.

1958 births
Living people
Constitutional Democratic Party of Japan politicians
Democratic Party of Japan politicians
Japanese politicians of Korean descent
Japanese people of South Korean descent
Members of the House of Councillors (Japan)
Naturalized citizens of Japan
Nihon University alumni
People from Shinjuku
Politicians from Tokyo